Shahapur is a town and census town in Thane district in the Indian state of Maharashtra.  Shahapur is surrounded by the Western Ghats.

Geography
It has an average elevation of 46 metres (151 feet).

Shahapur is also a major supplier of water to Mumbai.

References

Cities and towns in Thane district
Talukas in Maharashtra